Tom Cardy (born 12 June 1994) is an Australian comedian, musician, songwriter, and actor. He became known in Australia for his "Song Sequels" segments on the radio station Triple J, and achieved more international recognition when he began posting his comedy songs (with accompanying videos) on TikTok.

Cardy has composed music for the comedy series The Feed and The Moth Effect. His debut EP, Artificial Intelligence (2021), peaked at No. 40 on the ARIA Albums Chart. He was shortlisted for the AACTA Award for Favourite Digital Content Creator and the Streamy Awards' Craft Award for Writing.

Early life
Cardy was born in Sydney on 12 June 1994. He has two older sisters: Alex, a cinematographer, and Stephanie, a doctor. He and his sisters took piano and drum lessons during childhood at the behest of their parents, though he was the only one who opted to continue when their parents later gave them the option to stop. He studied music and psychology at the University of Sydney, then studied technical and further education to sharpen his music production skills.

Career
While studying psychology and music, Cardy wrote and performed for several university arts revues in addition to his own sold-out comedy festival shows. Around this time, he also played drums for Sydney band the Lulu Raes. In September 2020, he was featured on fellow musical comedian Bridie Connell's single "Armageddon (It On)". That year, he also began working with the radio station Triple J on its now-popular "Song Sequels" segments, in which he produces parodies of famous songs.

Cardy released his debut single, "Mixed Messages", on 30 July 2021. A week later, he released his debut EP, Artificial Intelligence. On 12 August, he was a guest on Triple J's drivetime program Hobba & Hing, where he discussed how the EP came to be made. Artificial Intelligence debuted at No. 40 on the ARIA Albums Chart. On 9 September, he released the single "Fruit Salad". On 20 October, he was nominated for the Craft Award for Writing at the 11th Streamy Awards. On 3 November, he was shortlisted for the audience-voted Favourite Digital Content Creator Award at the 11th AACTA Awards, but did not make it through to the list of five finalists. On 21 November, he released the Christmas-themed single "Not Quite Almost Christmas Time".

On 23 January 2022, Cardy had two songs voted into Triple J's Hottest 100 of 2021 when "Mixed Messages" and "H.Y.C.Y.BH" were respectively ranked at No. 17 and No. 11. On 9 February, he was cast alongside musician Montaigne in the SBS musical comedy Time to Buy. Montaigne also featured on his song "Red Flags". On 17 February, he was a guest on Hobba & Hing, where he debuted a song about host Lewis Hobba called "Weird Guy", which was recorded as a prank during Hobba's COVID-induced absence. The song additionally features Montaigne. On 21 February, he was featured in an interview published by Rolling Stone Australia, where he discussed his success on TikTok. On 6 August, he uploaded the video for a new song titled "Hey, I Don't Work Here" and announced that his debut studio album would be released in the near future. The album, titled Big Dumb Idiot, was released on 9 December 2022.

Musical style
Cardy's style of musical comedy often incorporates elements of awkward humour, observational humour, and surreal humour.

Discography

Studio albums

Extended plays

Singles

As lead artist

As featured artist

As songwriter only

Filmography

Awards and nominations

AACTA Awards

! 
|-
! scope="row"| 2021
| Himself
| Favourite Digital Content Creator
| 
| 
|}

Streamy Awards

! 
|-
! scope="row"| 2021
| Himself
| Craft Award for Writing
|  
| 
|}

References

External links
 
 
 

1994 births
Living people
Australian comedy musicians
Australian singer-songwriters
Australian TikTokers
Parody musicians
Australian parodists
21st-century Australian comedians
21st-century Australian male actors
21st-century Australian male writers